Letizia Quaranta (30 December 1892 – 9 January 1977) was an Italian film actress. Mainly active in the silent era, she also appeared in a few sound films. She was married to the director Carlo Campogalliani and appeared in a number of his films.

Letizia Quaranta had a twin sister, Isabella Quaranta, who was also an actress. Her older sister was actress Lidia Quaranta.

Selected filmography
 Love Everlasting (1913)
 Floretta and Patapon (1913)
 Hedda Gabler (1920)
 The Woman at Midnight (1925)
 The Doctor in Spite of Himself (1931)
 The Devil's Lantern (1931)
 Forbidden Music (1942)
 The Innocent Casimiro (1945)
 The Devil's Gondola (1946)
 Orphan of the Ghetto (1954)

References

Bibliography 
 Moliterno, Gino. The A to Z of Italian Cinema. Scarecrow Press, 2009.

External links 
 

1892 births
1977 deaths
Italian film actresses
Italian silent film actresses
20th-century Italian actresses
Actors from Turin